Sleeping Venus (also known as Sleeping Venus with Putti) is a c. 1603 painting by Annibale Carracci held by the Musée Condé in Chantilly, Oise, France. This oil painting measures 190x328cm. It depicts Venus sleeping with her arm above her head as putti frolic around her. Carracci painted Sleeping Venus for Odoardo Farnese. Giovanni Battista Agucchi wrote an ekphrasis of this painting that Carlo Cesare Malvasia included in his book Life of the Carracci. In The Lives of the Modern Painters, Sculptors and Architects, Giovanni Pietro Bellori wrote a description of the painting that paraphrases Agucchi's ekphrasis without citation.

References

Bibliography

Mythological paintings by Annibale Carracci
1603 paintings
Paintings in the collection of the Musée Condé
Paintings of Venus
Nude art
Paintings of children
Musical instruments in art